Eletefine is an isoquinoline alkaloid first isolated in 1998 from Cissampelos glaberrima. It is one of few known compounds containing the so-called stephaoxocane skeleton, alongside stephaoxocanidine, excentricine, and the stephalonganines.

References 

Isoquinoline alkaloids
Phenol ethers
Oxygen heterocycles